Diego Luiz de Siqueira Medeiros (born 28 March 1993) is a Brazilian professional footballer who plays as a left winger for Portuguese club Sporting da Covilhã.

Career
Medeiros began his career in Brazil with Vasco da Gama, where he was loaned to Audax before subsequently joining Audax permanently. In 2013, he signed for Portuguese club Ribeirão, making 16 appearances and scoring 3 goals in the 2013–14 Campeonato de Portugal. In January 2014, he joined Primeira Liga team Rio Ave but was immediately loaned out to Santa Clara. He played five times for Santa Clara before returning to Rio Ave. On 1 July 2014, Medeiros moved to Campeonato de Portugal club Famalicão. He made his Famalicão debut on 24 August in a league match against Felgueiras 1932.

Mederios went onto make 89 league appearances across three seasons for Famalicão. On 31 January 2017, he joined Primeira Liga side Paços de Ferreira. His first appearance for Paços arrived four days later when he came on as a second-half substitute in a Primeira Liga fixture with Vitória Guimarães. On 9 January 2018, he was loaned out to Nacional of LigaPro. His bow came on 11 days later versus Benfica B, prior to scoring his first goal on 4 February against ex-team Famalicão. He returned to his parent club midway through the year, before leaving on loan in January 2019 to fellow LigaPro team Covilhã.

On 15 July 2019, Medeiros headed off across LigaPro to Mafra. He netted on debut in the Taça da Liga versus Oliveirense, who eliminated Mafra from the competition. In total, the winger made nineteen appearances and scored seven goals; spread across three competitions. September 2020 saw Medeiros join Casa Pia.

Career statistics
.

References

External links

1993 births
Living people
Footballers from São Paulo (state)
Brazilian footballers
Brazilian expatriate footballers
Expatriate footballers in Portugal
Brazilian expatriate sportspeople in Portugal
Association football forwards
Campeonato Brasileiro Série A players
Campeonato de Portugal (league) players
Primeira Liga players
Liga Portugal 2 players
CR Vasco da Gama players
Grêmio Osasco Audax Esporte Clube players
G.D. Ribeirão players
Rio Ave F.C. players
C.D. Santa Clara players
F.C. Famalicão players
F.C. Paços de Ferreira players
C.D. Nacional players
S.C. Covilhã players
C.D. Mafra players
Casa Pia A.C. players
People from Lorena, São Paulo